Umm 'Ajra, was a Palestinian Arab village in the District of Baysan. It was depopulated by the Israel Defense Forces during the 1948 Arab-Israeli War on May 31, 1948, as part of Operation Gideon. It was located 4 km south of Baysan and the 'Ayn Umm 'Ajra provided the village with water.

History
The village had three khirbas: Tall al-Shaykh al-Simad, Hajj Makka, and Sursuq. In 1882,  the PEF's Survey of Western Palestine found at Sheik  Semad a "Small ruined Mukam of modern masonry."

British Mandate era
In  the 1922 census of Palestine, conducted by the  Mandatory Palestine authorities,  Umm 'Ajra had a population of 86 Muslims, increasing in the  1931 census   to 242, still all  Muslims, in 48  houses.

In  the 1945 statistics the population of Umm 'Ajra was 260 Muslims,  while the total land area was 6,443 dunams, according to an official land and population survey.  Of this, Arabs used 2,688 dunums for cereals, while a total of 203 dunums were classified as non-cultivable land.

1948, aftermath
Shif’a, a farm built in the 1950s, is on village land. Kfar Ruppin is located east of the village site, Ein HaNetziv on the western side, and  Avuqa (established in 1941, abandoned in 1952) to the north, none are on village land.

In 1992 it was described:  "The site and lands are cultivated. The remains of date palm trees can be seen, scattered across the northern side of the site."

References

Bibliography

External links
Welcome To Umm 'Ajra
  Umm 'Ajra,  Zochrot
Survey of Western Palestine, map 9:   IAA, Wikimedia commons

Arab villages depopulated during the 1948 Arab–Israeli War